Shadow of Doctor Syn is the seventh and last in the series of Doctor Syn novels by Russell Thorndike.  This story is set during the events of the French Revolution and part of the action has Syn rescuing people from the Reign of Terror in the style of the Scarlet Pimpernel.  The other main plot element is a love story.  Syn has fallen in love with young Cicily Cobtree and hopes his actions against Robespierre will earn him a pardon from the King.  When Cicily dies, Syn gives up his ideas of pardon and nearly loses his sanity.  This sets the stage for the fiendish character he becomes in Doctor Syn: A Tale of the Romney Marsh.

Shadow of Doctor Syn was published in 1944. It follows the events of Amazing Quest of Doctor Syn.  Though it is the last book written in the series it acts as a prequel for the first novel.

1944 British novels
Novels set in the French Revolution
Novels by Russell Thorndike
Rich & Cowan books